In combinatorics, the Dinitz theorem (formerly known as Dinitz conjecture) is a statement about the extension of arrays to partial Latin squares, proposed in 1979 by Jeff Dinitz, and proved in 1994 by Fred Galvin.

The Dinitz theorem is that given an n × n square array, a set of m symbols with m ≥ n, and for each cell of the array an n-element set drawn from the pool of m symbols, it is possible to choose a way of labeling each cell with one of those elements in such a way that no row or column repeats a symbol.
It can also be formulated as a result in graph theory, that the list chromatic index of the complete bipartite graph  equals . That is, if each edge of the complete bipartite graph is assigned a set of  colors, it is possible to choose one of the assigned colors for each edge
such that no two edges incident to the same vertex have the same color.

Galvin's proof generalizes to the statement that, for every bipartite multigraph, the list chromatic index equals its chromatic index. The more general edge list coloring conjecture states that the same holds not only for bipartite graphs, but also for any loopless multigraph. An even more general conjecture states that the list chromatic number of claw-free graphs always equals their chromatic number. The Dinitz theorem is also related to Rota's basis conjecture.

References

External links
 

Combinatorics
Latin squares
Graph coloring
Theorems in discrete mathematics
Conjectures
Conjectures that have been proved